Brunks Corner is an unincorporated community in Polk County, Oregon, United States, at the junction of Oregon Route 22 and Oak Grove Road, near the terminus of Oregon Route 51.

The 1861 Harrison Brunk House at Brunks Corner was built by an early Oregon pioneer and is now a historic house museum run by the Polk County Historical Society. The site was designated a Century Farm in 1959. The house was listed on the National Register of Historic Places in 1975.

References

External links
Historic images of the Brunk House from Salem Public Library
Image of Brunk House from Oregon Scenic Images of Polk county from Oregon State Archives

Unincorporated communities in Polk County, Oregon
Unincorporated communities in Oregon